Woolcombe is a surname. Notable people with the surname include:

Gary Woolcombe (born 1982), British boxer
Henry Woolcombe, Archdeacon of Barnstaple from 1865 to 1885. 
John Woolcombe (1680-1713), Member of Parliament for Plymouth in Devon 1702–5,Sheriff of Devon in 1711–12

See also
 Woollcombe